Schönbach is a municipality in the district Görlitz, in Saxony, Germany. It lies very close to the Czech Republic.

References 

Populated places in Görlitz (district)